Xiangornis is an enantiornithine bird from the Lower Cretaceous Jiufofang Formation of Western Liaoning, China.

References

Enantiornitheans
Fossil taxa described in 2012
Early Cretaceous birds of Asia
Jiufotang fauna